Odontomyia is a genus of soldier flies in the family Stratiomyidae.

See also
 List of Odontomyia species

References

Stratiomyidae
Brachycera genera
Taxa named by Johann Wilhelm Meigen